Gamma-aminobutyric acid receptor subunit rho-2 is a protein that in humans is encoded by the GABRR2 gene.

GABA is the major inhibitory neurotransmitter in the mammalian brain where it acts at GABA receptors, which are ligand-gated chloride channels. GABRR2 is a member of the rho subunit family.

See also
 GABAA-ρ receptor

References

Further reading

External links 
 

Ion channels